Neolimnomyia is a genus of crane fly in the family Limoniidae.

Distribution
Europe & Africa

Species
N. baluba (Alexander, 1963)
N. batava (Edwards, 1938)
N. filata (Walker, 1856)
N. fumivena (Alexander, 1956)
N. hetaira (Alexander, 1956)
N. natalica (Alexander, 1956)
N. prospera (Alexander, 1956)
N. ranavalona (Alexander, 1965)
N. suffilata (Alexander, 1946)
N. tributa (Alexander, 1956)

References

Limoniidae
Nematocera genera
Diptera of Europe
Diptera of Africa